Jay and Silent Bob Strike Back is a 2001 American satirical stoner buddy comedy film written, co-edited, and directed by Kevin Smith and produced and co-edited by Scott Mosier. The film is the fifth set in the View Askewniverse, a growing collection of characters and settings that developed out of Smith's cult-favorite Clerks. It stars Jason Mewes and Smith respectively as the two eponymous characters. The film also stars Shannon Elizabeth, Jason Lee, Ben Affleck, Matt Damon, Will Ferrell, Eliza Dushku, Ali Larter, and Chris Rock, among many others, most of which in cameo appearances. The title and logo for Jay and Silent Bob Strike Back are direct references to The Empire Strikes Back.

Originally intended to be the last film set in the Askewniverse, or to feature Jay and Silent Bob, Strike Back features many characters from the previous Askew films, some in dual roles and/or reprising roles from the previous four entries. The film was a minor commercial success, grossing $33.8 million worldwide from a $22 million budget, and received mixed reviews from critics.

Smith announced in February 2017 that he was writing a sequel called Jay and Silent Bob Reboot and started filming in February 2019 and was released on October 15 that same year. From February to June 2019, Smith additionally re-adapted the plot of the film to the character of Mindy McCready / Hit-Girl in the relaunched Image comic book series, titled Hit-Girl: The Golden Rage of Hollywood, with Dave Lizewski filling the role of Banky Edwards.

Plot
Dante Hicks and Randal Graves (Clerks) put a restraining order on Jay and Silent Bob, finally fed up with their drug dealing antics outside the Quick Stop and RST Video after the duo tell a pair of teenagers that Dante and Randal were married in a Star Wars themed wedding. Not allowed within 100 feet of either stores for at least a year, Jay and Silent Bob visit Brodie Bruce (Mallrats) at his comic shop where they learn that that Miramax Films is adapting Bluntman and Chronic, the comic book based on their likenesses. 

The pair visit Holden McNeil (Chasing Amy), co-writer of Bluntman and Chronic, and demand him to give them their royalties from the film, but Holden explains he sold his share of the rights to co-creator Banky Edwards. Seeing the film's negative reception online, the pair set out for Hollywood to prevent the film from tainting their image, or at least to receive the royalties owed to them.

En route, they befriend an animal liberation group: Justice, Sissy, Missy, Chrissy, and Brent. The organization is a front; Brent is a patsy, who will free animals from a laboratory as a diversion while the girls rob a diamond depository. Jay throws Brent out of the van to get closer to Justice, to whom he is attracted. Justice is fond of the pair, but reluctantly accepts them as new patsies.

While the girls steal the diamonds, Jay and Silent Bob free the animals, stealing an orangutan named Suzanne. They escape as the police arrive and the van explodes, believing the girls have perished.

Federal Wildlife Marshal Willenholly (whose name is taken from Land of the Lost characters ) arrives; oblivious to the diamond heist, he claims jurisdiction due to the escaped animals, all of which have been recovered but the orangutan. 

The officers find footage of a video Sissy recorded of Jay claiming to be "the clit commander", with accompanying literature that "Clit" is an acronym for Coalition for the Liberation of Itinerant Tree-Dwellers. In an interview with Reg Hartner on TV, Willenholly declares the crime an act of terrorism and calls for backup to hunt "the two most dangerous men on the planet."

Hiding inside a diner, the pair dress Suzanne as a child and pretend to be a gay couple, with Suzanne as their kid. Willenholly, not wanting to face the political repercussions of "arresting a gay couple", lets them leave but quickly catches on and resumes pursuit. The pair jump into a sewer system, and Willenholly is tricked into jumping off a dam.

Suzanne is abducted by a Hollywood animal acting agency called "Critters of Hollywood". Jay laments that they will never see Suzanne again, only to have Silent Bob angrily, and loudly, explain that the sign on the car (also calling Jay a dumbfuck for not getting what Silent Bob's gesturing right after Suzanne was stolen was about) indicated that they will probably meet up with Suzanne in Hollywood. The duo then hitch a ride and arrive in Hollywood. When they get to the Miramax lot, they find themselves in the background of an E! News newscast with Jules Asner about the online threat the duo sent against the studio earlier in the film. Watching the news, Justice takes the diamonds to Hollywood to fix things, with Willenholly close behind.

Chased by studio security guard Gordon through the Miramax lot and several movie sets, including Good Will Hunting 2: Hunting Season, and reclaiming Suzanne from the set of Scream 4, Jay and Silent Bob end up in the dressing room of Jason Biggs and James Van Der Beek, the actors playing Bluntman and Chronic respectively in the film. Suzanne beats up the actors, knocking them out, and Jay and Silent Bob assume the roles.

Meeting the film's racist director Chaka Luther King, who mistakes them for Biggs and Van Der Beek's stunt doubles, Jay and Silent Bob are then escorted onto the set and forced to fight Mark Hamill, playing the supervillain Cocknocker (a combination of Hamill's roles as The Joker, The Trickster, and Luke Skywalker) in a Star Wars-esque battle. Willenholly, armed with a shotgun, arrives to capture the pair, but Justice protects them, admitting the CLIT organization was only a diversion.

The other thieves arrive and a climactic gun fight ensues. Jay and Silent Bob locate Banky and demand their money. Banky at first refuses on account of the large amount of money Miramax paid him for the film. Silent Bob then informs Banky that he violated their original likeness rights contract by not getting their permission before selling the film rights to Miramax, and therefore could face serious legal troubles if he doesn't meet their demands. Banky finally relents and agrees to give the duo half of what he makes from the movie. Justice then turns herself and her former team in to Willenholly in exchange for a shorter sentence and freeing Jay and Silent Bob.

Jay and Silent Bob spend their royalty money locating everyone who expressed negative opinions on the internet about the movie and their characters, including children and members of the clergy, and travel to assault them. The scene cuts to the audience leaving the theater, having just watched the Bluntman and Chronic movie, to poor reception. Jay and Silent Bob, accompanied by Justice and Willenholly (now an FBI agent), go across the street to enjoy the after party, featuring a performance from Morris Day and The Time.

After the credits, God (Dogma) closes the View Askewniverse book.

Cast
 Jason Mewes as Jay/Chronic
 Kevin Smith as Silent Bob/Bluntman
 Ben Affleck as himself/Holden McNeil/Chuckie Sullivan/voice of Guard Over Radio
 Jeff Anderson as Randal Graves
 Brian Christopher O'Halloran as Dante Hicks
 Shannon Elizabeth as Justice
 Eliza Dushku as Sissy
 Ali Larter as Chrissy
 Jennifer Schwalbach as Missy
 Will Ferrell as Federal Wildlife Marshal Willenholly
 Jason Lee as Brodie Bruce/Banky Edwards
 Matt Damon as himself/Will Hunting
 Judd Nelson as Sheriff
 George Carlin as Hitchhiker
 Carrie Fisher as Nun
 Seann William Scott as Brent
 Jon Stewart as Reg Hartner
 Tracy Morgan as Pumpkin Escobar
 Chris Rock as Chaka Luther King
 Jamie Kennedy as Chaka's production assistant
 Mark Hamill as Cocknocker/voice of Scooby-Doo
 Marc Blucas as Fred lookalike
 Matthew James as Shaggy lookalike
 Jane Silvia as Velma lookalike
 Carmen Llywelyn as Daphne lookalike
 Diedrich Bader as Gordon, the Miramax security guard
 Bryan Johnson as Steve-Dave Pulski
 Walter Flanagan as Walter "The Fanboy" Grover
 Scott Mosier as Willam Black/Good Will Hunting 2 assistant director
 Renee Humphrey as Tricia Jones
 Joey Lauren Adams as Alyssa Jones
 Dwight Ewell as Hooper LaMont/Hooper X
 Scott William Winters as himself/Clark
 William B. Davis (uncredited cameo) as The Smoking Man
 Alanis Morissette (cameo) as God
 Jimmy Palmiotti (uncredited cameo) as Pizza Delivery Man

Additionally, Wes Craven, Jules Asner, Steve Kmetko, Gus Van Sant, Jason Biggs, James Van Der Beek, Shannen Doherty, and Morris Day all appear as themselves.

Production
The film's plot was heavily inspired by Chasing Dogma, a comic book miniseries that Smith wrote in 1998 and 1999 to explore events that happened in the Askewniverse between Chasing Amy and Dogma.

The film was originally titled View Askew 5 and the title was changed to Jay and Silent Bob Strike Back. Filming began on January 14, 2001, and ended on April 19, 2001. Filming took in place in New Jersey, and mostly in California.

On his podcast Jay & Silent Bob Get Old, Kevin Smith explained at length about how much of a "headache" the film was to make, mostly owing to Jason Mewes's drug and alcohol abuse turning him into a "ticking time bomb", which threatened to shut the project down at any moment. During pre-production, Mewes would have constant mood swings due to heroin withdrawal, to the point that Smith actually threw him out of his car on their way to the set one day. Mewes would compensate for his lack of drugs by drinking heavily after every day of shooting and nearly got into a fist fight with Scott Mosier when he had to come back one night for a re-shoot while drunk. When the shoot wrapped, Smith told Mewes point-blank to get sober or he would never speak to him again.

Release

Box office
Jay and Silent Bob Strike Back grossed $30.1 million in the United States and Canada and $3.7 million in other territories for a worldwide total of $33.8 million, against a production budget of $22 million.

The film grossed $11 million in its opening weekend, finishing third at the box office behind two other comedy sequels, American Pie 2 ($12.5 million) and Rush Hour 2 ($11.6 million).

Critical reception
Jay and Silent Bob Strike Back received mixed reviews from critics. On review aggregator Rotten Tomatoes the film has an approval rating of 52% based on 151 reviews, with an average rating of 5.60/10. The site's critical consensus reads, "Fans can expect a good laugh as the cast from Smith's previous films reunite for Jay and Silent Bob's last bow. The loose plotting and crude language may be too much for others though." On Metacritic the film has a score of 51 out of 100, based on 31 critics, indicating "mixed or average reviews". Audiences surveyed by CinemaScore gave the film an average grade of "B+" on an A+ to F scale.

Roger Ebert gave the film 3 out of 4 stars, writing that "[w]hether you will like 'Jay and Silent Bob' depends on who you are ... Kevin Smith's movies are either made specifically for you, or specifically not made for you". Adam Smith of Empire gave the film 3/5 stars, writing that "[w]hen it's good it's very, very good, but when it's bad it's offensive", and noting that "the gag hit/miss ratio is really only about 50/50". Scott Tobias of The A.V. Club wrote that "[e]ven at a slim 95 minutes, Jay And Silent Bob lets initially funny scenes trail off into long-winded monologues and silly digressions", and Elvis Mitchell of The New York Times called the film "[may]be the greatest picture ever made for 14-year-old boys. Mr. Smith may have hit his target, but he aimed very low." In August 2001, Mike Schulz of River Cities' Reader wrote that, "for sheer laughs, both mindless and incredibly smart, nothing since 1997's Waiting for Guffman has even compared."

Home media
Jay and Silent Bob Strike Back was released on VHS and on a two-disc DVD in the Dimension Collector's Series on February 26, 2002, presented in its original 2.35:1 widescreen aspect ratio. Among the bonus features on the DVD is an audio commentary by Smith, Mosier, and Mewes, 42 deleted, extended, and alternate scenes, music videos for Stroke 9's Kick Some Ass and Afroman's Because I Got High, storyboards, a gag reel, a behind the scenes special, still galleries, cast and crew filmographies, and TV spots.  A Blu-ray version of the film was released on September 19, 2006 with all features carried over from the DVD.

Soundtrack

Music from the Dimension Motion Picture: Jay and Silent Bob Strike Back, the soundtrack to the film, was released on August 14, 2001, by Universal Records. Varèse Sarabande released the original score by James L. Venable. It alternates film dialogue with songs of various genres that appear in the film. It features the 2001 Afroman hit, "Because I Got High", whose music video featured the characters Jay and Silent Bob. 'Tube Of Wonderful' was previously used as the theme song from Smith's 1997 film Chasing Amy.

 Interlude: Cue Music by Jason Lee (as Brodie Bruce) – 0:03
 "Jay's Rap 2001" by Jason Mewes (as Jay) – 0:32
 "Kick Some Ass" by Stroke 9 – 4:05
 Holden on Affleck by Ben Affleck as Holden McNeil – 0:28
 "Tube of Wonderful" by Dave Pirner – 1:45
 Cyber Savvy by Ben Affleck and Jason Mewes (as Holden and Jay) – 0:07
 "Choked Up" by Minibar – 2:58
 Doobie Snacks by Jason Mewes (as Jay) – 0:08
 "Magic Carpet Ride" by Steppenwolf – 2:43
 Jay & Justice by Shannon Elizabeth and Jason Mewes (as Justice and Jay) – 0:11
 "Bad Medicine" by Bon Jovi – 3:55
 Stealing Monkeys – 0:08
 "This Is Love" by PJ Harvey – 3:45
 Advice from Above – 0:23
 "The Devil's Song" by Marcy Playground – 2:52
 Idiots vs. The Internet – 0:06
 "Tougher Than Leather" by Run-D.M.C. – 4:23
 Willenholly's Woe by Will Ferrell (as Willenholly) – 0:09
 "Bullets" by Bob Schneider – 4:22
 Touching a Brother's Heart by Jason Mewes and Tracy Morgan (as Jay and Pumpkin Escobar) – 0:23
 "Hiphopper" by Thomas Rusiak featuring Teddybears STHLM – 4:46
 Two Thumbs Up by Chris Rock (as Chaka Luther King) – 0:07
 "Jackass" by Bloodhound Gang – 2:26
 A Smooth Pimp and a Man Servant by Jason Mewes (as Jay) – 0:16
 "Jungle Love" (Live) by Morris Day and The Time – 3:03
 NWP by Chris Rock (as Chaka Luther King) – 0:14
 "Because I Got High" by Afroman – 3:18

MPAA rating and GLAAD controversy
In August 2001, three weeks prior to release, the film came under fire from the Gay & Lesbian Alliance Against Defamation (GLAAD), for its "overwhelmingly homophobic tone", which included an abundance of gay jokes and characters excessively using the term "gay" to mean something derogatory. The scenes deemed particularly offensive included Jay's vehement refusal of giving oral sex to a male driver when hitchhiking, and Jay chastising Silent Bob for being willing to perform fellatio on him to get the security guard to let them go. Following an advance screening of the film, former GLAAD media director Scott Seomin asked Smith to make a $10,000 donation to the Matthew Shepard Foundation, as well as to include a reference to GLAAD's cause in the ending credits.

On the bonus DVD (176 minutes), Smith explains in the on-camera intros of the deleted scenes that several scenes had to be cut from the theatrical release, due to the film initially receiving an NC-17 rating from the MPAA. He also mentions in the audio commentary of the feature film that it took three submissions to the MPAA for the film to earn an R rating.

See also
 Hit-Girl: The Golden Rage of Hollywood, Smith's comic book re-adaptation of the concept.
 Oh, What a Lovely Tea Party, a documentary about the making of the film.
 Jay & Silent Bob Reboot, Smith's "requel" to the film.
 List of films featuring fictional films

Notes
According to Ethan Alter of Film Journal International, Smith did not intend to make another View Askewniverse film upon completion of Jay and Silent Bob Strike Back, but only decided to do so several years later, following the unsuccessful release of Jersey Girl.

Will Ferrell would later star in the 2009 film adaptation of Land of the Lost as Dr. Rick Marshall alongside Danny McBride as Will Stanton and Anna Friel as Holly Cantrell.

References

External links

 
 
 
 Jay and Silent Bob Strike Back Filming Locations at Movie Locations Guide
 Jay and Silent Bob Strike Back movie stills at Virtual History Film

2000s buddy comedy films
2000s comedy road movies
2001 comedy films
2001 films
American comedy films
American buddy comedy films
Films directed by Kevin Smith
American films about cannabis
Comedy crossover films
Crossover films
LGBT-related controversies in film
Rating controversies in film
Films about filmmaking
Films scored by James L. Venable
Films set in studio lots
Films set in Los Angeles
Films shot in Los Angeles
Films shot in New Jersey
Films with screenplays by Kevin Smith
Red Bank, New Jersey in fiction
Films set in New Jersey
American comedy road movies
View Askew Productions films
View Askewniverse films
Miramax films
Dimension Films films
Stoner films
Films produced by Scott Mosier
2000s English-language films
2000s American films